Sobětuchy is a municipality and village in Chrudim District in the Pardubice Region of the Czech Republic. It has about 1,000 inhabitants.

Administrative parts
Villages of Pouchobrady and Vrcha are administrative parts of Sobětuchy.

References

External links

 

Villages in Chrudim District